Ad Astra is a public artwork by American artist Richard Lippold. The abstract sculpture is located outside on the Jefferson Drive entrance of and in the collection of the National Air and Space Museum in Washington, D.C. The sculpture's title is Latin, meaning "To the Stars".

Description

This abstract statue is made of gold-colored polished stainless steel. Standing at 100 feet tall, the piece consists of a "...three-planed narrow shaft ending in a pointed tip, penetrates a triple star-like cluster near its apex".

Information

Lippold believed that "the characteristic art of our time deals with the conquest of space", with Ad Astra symbolizing just that. In 2009 the sculpture made an appearance in the film Night at the Museum: Battle of the Smithsonian.

See also
 Continuum sculpture
 Delta Solar
 List of public art in Washington, D.C., Ward 2

References

Further reading
 "Fabricating a soaring symbol of the space age {Richard Lippold's Ad astra}." AIA Journal 65, (October 1976): Art Index Retrospective: 1929–1984 (H. W. Wilson Company)

External links
 Ad Astra, an Abstract Sculpture by Richard Lippold from What is Abstract Sculpture?
 Ad Astra on dcMemorials .
 Modern-day Medici wanted: Vatican looks for Donor for Richard Lippold Sculpture from Collectos.com
 Richard Lippold, Sculptor of Metal Abstractions, Dies at 87 from The New York Times, a brief mention of the sculpture as a notable work

1976 sculptures
Abstract sculptures in Washington, D.C.
Outdoor sculptures in Washington, D.C.
Sculptures of the Smithsonian Institution
Steel sculptures in Washington, D.C.
Southwest Federal Center